Endotricha luteobasalis is a species of snout moth in the genus Endotricha. It is found in China (Guizhou, Yunnan, Zhejiang).

References

Moths described in 1935
Endotrichini
Taxa named by Aristide Caradja